Dizzasco is a comune (municipality) in the Province of Como in the Italian region Lombardy, located about  north of Milan and about  north of Como.

Dizzasco borders the following municipalities: Argegno, Blessagno, Centro Valle Intelvi, Cerano d'Intelvi, Pigra, Schignano.

References

Cities and towns in Lombardy